Warner Pacific University is a private Christian university in Portland, Oregon. Founded in 1937, the university is accredited by the Northwest Commission on Colleges and Universities and affiliated with the Church of God.

History
The school was established by the Church of God, whose founder was Daniel Sidney Warner. The church voted to establish the college in September 1935, and in January 1936 the church bought land in Spokane, Washington, for the school. It was then incorporated on February 9, 1937, as Pacific Bible College with classes starting in October 1937.

Then Pacific Bible College moved to Oregon in 1940 to its current campus in the Mount Tabor neighborhood of Southeast Portland. In 1959, it was renamed as Warner Pacific College, and in 1961 received full accreditation by the Northwest Commission on Colleges and Universities. The university long sought to expand its campus, most recently (in 2006) pursuing the purchase of a nine-acre portion of city property adjoining the park. In its negotiations, the university was represented by attorney and former Parks commissioner Jim Francesconi, but that deal fell through when the neighborhood association got wind of negotiations and felt that the sale of the public land was improper. In 2018, the school changed its name to Warner Pacific University.

As part of the COVID-19 pandemic, the school received between $1 million and $2 million in federally backed small business loan from Washington Trust Bank as part of the Paycheck Protection Program.

Campus

Warner Pacific is situated on a  urban campus on the southern slope of Mount Tabor.  Since the 1890s, the park has contained reservoirs that serve the city of Portland, and that are now listed on the National Register of Historic Places. The city's drinking water is being transitioned to covered reservoirs at Powell Butte; the transition is scheduled to be complete by 2020.

Buildings on campus include McGuire Auditorium, the Otto F. Linn Library, Gotham Hall, and the C.C. Perry Gymnasium. Bounded on the south by Southeast Division Street, the campus runs from (what would be) 65th Avenue to 70th Avenue.

Academics
Warner Pacific University's traditional undergraduate program offers 25 majors, seven areas of pre-professional study, and 29 minors. For working adults, Warner Pacific University offers its adult degree program with an associate degree in organizational dynamics; Bachelor's degrees in accounting, business administration, healthcare administration and human development; a Master of Science degree in management and organizational leadership, a Master of Education degree, a Master of Arts in Human services degree, a MMOL-to-MBA bridge program, and a Master of Arts in Teaching degree.

Enrollment totals 1,333 students with a student to faculty ratio of 14:1. Students at Warner Pacific are from eighteen states and nine countries. The on-campus library contains 56,647 volumes. The college was ranked as the sixth best among western regional colleges by U.S. News & World Report in 2016.

Warner Pacific University was the first four-year college or university in Oregon to receive designation as a Hispanic-Serving Institution by the U.S. Department of Education. The qualifications to receive this designation is having 25% of students who identify as Latino or Hispanic, and Warner Pacific has 30.1% of their student body who identify as Latino or Hispanic.

Athletics

The Warner Pacific athletic teams are called the Knights. The university is a member of the National Association of Intercollegiate Athletics (NAIA), primarily competing in the Cascade Collegiate Conference (CCC) since the 1999–2000 academic year.

Warner Pacific competes in seven intercollegiate sports: Men's sports include basketball, soccer and wrestling. Women's sports include basketball, soccer, softball and volleyball. Former sports included men's & women's golf, men's & women's track & field, men's & women's cross country and women's wrestling (with the last three being affected due to the COVID-19 pandemic).

The school added men's and women's wrestling starting with the 2014–15 school year. The school's colors are baby blue and Portland sky grey.

Notable alumni

Thomas A Fudge, leading authority on Jan Hus

 Vic Gilliam, politician

Brian Jean, Canadian politician

 Mel White, clergyman, author
 William Paul Young, author

References

External links

 Official website
 Official athletics website

 
Educational institutions established in 1937
Universities and colleges affiliated with the Church of God (Anderson, Indiana)
Council for Christian Colleges and Universities
1937 establishments in Oregon
Cascade Collegiate Conference
Universities and colleges accredited by the Northwest Commission on Colleges and Universities
Universities and colleges in Portland, Oregon
Mount Tabor, Portland, Oregon
Private universities and colleges in Oregon